Michael Raeburn (22 January 1943 or 1948) is a Zimbabwean filmmaker.

Life
Raeburn's mother was partly Egyptian and his father was British. Born in Cairo, he lived in Rhodesia from the age of three. He studied at the University of Rhodesia, London and Aix-en-Provence.

After making his satirical 1969 film Rhodesia Countdown (Directors' Fortnight Cannes), he was declared a prohibited immigrant in Rhodesia, and spent twelve years in exile.

Living in London, Raeburn met James Baldwin in 1974. The pair became friends, and on-off lovers, and in 1977 began working together on a movie adaptation of Giovanni's Room. Marlon Brando agreed to play the part of Guillaume, and Robert De Niro also showed interest in the project. At Baldwin's 53rd birthday in 1977 guests were told that the film was going to be made. However, Raeburn eventually gave up the project, frustrated at financial demands made by Baldwin's agent.

Films
 Rhodesia Countdown 1969 Vaughan-Rogosin Films   Directors' Fortnight - Cannes; Peace prize - Mannheim; London Int.Festival.
 The Plastic Shamrock 1970 Vaughan-Rogosin Films / WDR Cologne. Ireland's industrial revolution in the 1960s.
 Ireland Behind The Wire 1973 Berwick Street Cooperative. 
 Beyond The Plains Where Man Was Born 1976 Signfour Films/7 Productions. A maasai tells the story of his life. London Int. Festival; Sydney FF.
 Requiem For A Village 1975 (Producer)  London Int. Festival.
 The Life of Henry Cotton 1976 ATV. Narrated by Sean Connery. 
 Sunday Sweet Sunday 1978 Westward TV. Series on 'The Sunday Lunch' in different countries, among different classes.
 The Grass Is Singing aka USA Killing Heat 1980. Chibote Ltd/Swedish Film Institute. Based on the novel by Doris Lessing. Camera: Bille August. Starring: Karen Black, John Thaw, John Kani.  Leonard Maltins's Guide ***  London Int.Festival; Toronto FF; San Francisco FF; Sydney. FF. FF
 Soweto 1988 Goldcrest Films/GEI/Skandia/NTA. Music: Hugh Masekela, Stimela and the ANC Choir. Camera: Dick Pope. Starring: Sam Williams, Dambiza Kente, Sophie Mxhina. Romeo and Juliet story set during the 1976 riots in Soweto. Filmed in Nigeria and Zimbabwe.
 Under Africa Skies 1988 BBC/Island Records.  Series on African music in Zimbabwe, Ethiopia, Mali, Algeria.
 Jit 1990 Film Africa/Gavin Films.Virgn Records.  Romantic comedy set in Zimbabwe.  MOMA: New York-New Directors; Fespaco 'Best cinematography'; Amiens 'Best actor'.  
 Winds Of Rage aka  Vent de Colère 1998  British Screen/The Works/France 3. A peasant farmer unable to adapt to a changing world, kills himself. His daughter turns the farm around. Camera: Chris Seager.  Starring: Patrick Bouchitey, Coraly Zahonero, Bernadette Lafont. 
 Home Sweet Home 1999  Lizard Films France-New York.   An experimental film about childhood memories shot on DV8 blown to 35mm.  Cannes Film Festival- ACDO 'Académie Du Documentaire'; Festival Africano di Milano 'Premio C.E.I'; Vue d'Afrique, Montréal; Cinéma du Réel, Paris; Int. Festival of Gotteborg.
 Zimbabwe Countdown aka ZImbabwe: de la Libération au Chaos 2003.  Arte France.  1st Prize African Film Festival Milan 2003; 1st Prize ‘Beyond Borders' Clermont Ferrand; London Film Festival double bill with 'Rhodesia Countdown'; Prix Italia, Catania Int. Festival; Cape Town World Cinema, 'Signis International Jury Award'; Etats Généraux du Documentaire, France.  
 Melvyn The Magnificent aka Let's Hit The Streets 2005. FMC-France/SABC. Among the gangs during The Cape Town Carnival.
 Triomf'' 2008  GH Films, France/Giraffe, South Africa.  Based on the Noma Prize novel by Marlène van Niekerk.  Starring: Lionel Newton, Vanessa Cooke, Obed Baloyi, Eduan van Jaarsveldt.   “Best South African Film” DIFF; “Best Actor” Tariffa; London Int. Festival; Pusan Int. Festival.

Books
 ″Black Fire! Accounts of the guerilla war in Rhodesia.″ with an introduction by James Baldwin. 1978 J. Friedmann, London. USA title ″We Are Everywhere″ Random House Inc New York 1979. Zimbabwe Publishing House 1981.
 "JIT" Anvil Press 1991/Kaleidoscope 1994. Novel about a young man from an African village trying to make his mark in the big city.
 "Night Of The Fireflies" David Philip 2006. M-Net Literary Award.  While searching for his lover in war-torn Mozambique, a confused stranger meets a charismatic but dangerous medium who changes his life.

Retrospectives
Museé Dapper, Paris, 2010 ; Festival de Douarnenez, France, 2011 ; Museum of Cinema, Munich, 2012 ; Jeu de Paume Museum, Paris, 2014

References

External links
 
 

1948 births
Living people
Zimbabwean film directors
Zimbabwean writers